Cáceres is a town and municipality in the Colombian department of Antioquia.

Cáceres is one of the oldest towns in Antioquia . Its history is linked to the exploitation of gold and it was founded in the year of 1576 by Captain Don Gaspar de Rodas, who arrived at the banks of the Cauca River advancing on the right bank. Once chosen the place, he ordered the installation of 30 ranches and with a very animated ceremony, that town received the name of San Martín de Cáceres .

Municipalities of Antioquia Department
Populated places established in 1576